William Buckingham (4 January 1798 – date of death unknown) was an English cricketer.  Buckingham was a right-handed batsman.  He was born at Uxbridge, Middlesex.

Buckingham made his first-class debut for a team of right-handed players in the Left-Handed v Right-Handed fixture in 1835 at Lord's Cricket Ground. He made two further appearances in first-class cricket, playing for the Players in the Gentlemen v Players fixture of 1835, before making his third appearance for England against Kent and Sussex in 1836. Buckingham scored a total of 76 runs in his three appearances, at an average of 19.00 and a high score of 40 not out.

References

External links

1798 births
People from Uxbridge
English cricketers
Left-Handed v Right-Handed cricketers
Players cricketers
Year of death missing